2,3,5,7-Tetraahydroxy-1,4-naphthalenedione, also called 2,3,5,7-tetrahydroxynaphthoquinone or spinochrome B, is an organic compound with formula , formally derived from 1,4-naphthoquinone through the replacement of four hydrogen atoms by hydroxyl (OH) groups.

Spinochrome B occurs naturally as pigment in the shell and spines of sea urchins such as the Japanese dull red species aka-uni (Pseudocentrotus depressus), the greenish-black murasaki-uni (Heliocidaris crassispina), and the brown bafun-uni (Strongylocentrotus pulcherrimus).  It is soluble in methanol and crystallizes as bright red needles that sublime above 200 °C.

The compound gives a greenish yellow solution when treated with sodium hydroxide, a green solution with ferric chloride, and a green precipitate with lead acetate. It forms a fourfold acetate ester,4, that crystallizes from methanol as yellow needles that melt at 157 °C.

See also 
 Hexahydroxynaphthoquinone (spinochrome E)
 2,3,5,6,8-Pentahydroxy-1,4-naphthalenedione (spinochrome D)

References 

1,4-Naphthoquinones
Catechols
Resorcinols
Tetrols
Hydroxynaphthoquinones
3-Hydroxypropenals within hydroxyquinones